Thioreductor is a Gram-negative, mesophilic, hydrogen-oxidizing, sulfur-reducing and motile genus of bacteria from the phylum Campylobacterota with one known species (Thioreductor micantisoli). Thioreductor micantisoli has been isolated from hydrothermal sediments from the Iheya North from the Mid-Okinawa Trough in Japan.

References

Bacteria
Bacteria genera
Monotypic bacteria genera